Down is an American heavy metal supergroup that formed in New Orleans, Louisiana, in 1991. The current lineup consists of vocalist Phil Anselmo (Pantera and Superjoint Ritual), drummer Jimmy Bower (Crowbar, Eyehategod, Superjoint Ritual), guitarists Pepper Keenan (Corrosion of Conformity) and Kirk Windstein (Crowbar), and bassist Pat Bruders (Goatwhore).

Since their formation, Down has gone on hiatus twice and has released five studio albums. The first three were LPs entitled NOLA (1995), Down II: A Bustle in Your Hedgerow (2002), and Down III: Over the Under (2007). In 2008, the band began working on additional material, which resulted in two EPs entitled Down IV – Part I, released in September 2012, and Down IV – Part II, released in May 2014.

History

Formation and NOLA (1991–1998)

Down formed in 1991 with vocalist Phil Anselmo of Pantera, drummer Jimmy Bower of Eyehategod, guitarists Pepper Keenan of Corrosion of Conformity and Kirk Windstein of Crowbar and bassist Todd Strange, also of Crowbar. All of the band members were longtime friends, and shared interest in bands such as Black Sabbath, Trouble, and Saint Vitus, which would significantly influence the music they made. The band made a three-track demo for underground trading. In an effort to build a fan base, Anselmo and Keenan would ask heavy metal fans if they had ever "heard of this band, Down" and hand them copies of the tape without telling the person that they were in the band. Eventually, the tape was distributed throughout the United States and Down played a small concert in its hometown. A record executive from Elektra Records was attending the show. When he found out who the members of the band were, he signed Down to a recording contract.

Down released its debut album, NOLA, on September 19, 1995, debuting at number 55 on the Billboard 200. AllMusic reviewer David Reamer gave the album a nearly perfect 4.5 out of 5 stars, praising the songs "Temptations Wings", "Stone the Crow", and "Bury Me in Smoke". Reamer stated that "this is a landmark album that combines the talents of dedicated rock musicians, and should be included in any collection of heavy metal music." NOLA was supported by a 13-date tour, and afterward the band went on hiatus in order to return to their respective bands.

A Bustle in Your Hedgerow and Over the Under (1999–2008)

In 1999, while Down was on hiatus, Strange left the band and was replaced by Pantera bassist Rex Brown. In late November 2001, Down came back from hiatus to make another record. The band wrote and recorded Down II: A Bustle in Your Hedgerow in 28 "drug and booze induced" days in Phil Anselmo's barn called "Nödferatu's Lair." The album was released on March 26, 2002, but was not received with the same positive reviews as NOLA. Blabbermouth.net reviewer Borivoj Krgin stated, "Down II appears to have been thrown together more haphazardly, with much of the material falling short of the standard set by the Down's classic debut offering." Despite mixed reviews, the album debuted at number 44 on the Billboard 200. To support the album, Down toured on the second stage of Ozzfest in 2002. Afterward, the band once again entered an indefinite hiatus to focus on their respective bands.

Newly signed to Warner Bros. Records, Down once again reformed in 2006. The band wrote an album over the course of a year. The lyrical content of Down III: Over the Under covers subjects such as the breakup of Pantera, the murder of ex-Pantera guitarist Dimebag Darrell, the band's anger at the aftermath of Hurricane Katrina, and Anselmo's recovery from back surgery and drug addiction. Debuting at number 26 on the Billboard 200, the album was released on September 25, 2007, and received generally positive reviews. Kirk Miller of Decibel Magazine said of the album, "for almost an hour, it's like the metal world was set right again."

The release of Over the Under was preceded by a tour with Heaven & Hell and Megadeth. To further support their album, Down headlined a tour starting at the end of September 2007.

On April 22, 2008, the BBC Radio 1 Rockshow broadcast a new session of Down recordings featuring alternate versions of "N.O.D.", "Beneath the Tides", and "Jail", along with a cover of "When the Levee Breaks" (written by Kansas Joe McCoy and his wife Memphis Minnie, and famously covered by Led Zeppelin).

Diary of a Mad Band (2008–2010)

On July 24, 2008, frontman Phil Anselmo mentioned in a post on the band's Myspace blog that Down had been "fucking around with some new material" and had "enough material already recorded"—at least six new songs in addition to those that did not make the final cut on Down III: Over the Under. What or how much will be included on the tentative Down IV is uncertain, but according to Anselmo, there is  "definitely enough for an awesome EP, with some surprises within."

Asked in November 2008 what the current status of the new album was, bassist Rex Brown told Billboard.com that Down had been "writing constantly on the road. We still have all these ideas, and we play a lot of new stuff at sound check, just to feel it out. Hopefully, we can get back in the studio in the fall and work on something."

On February 18, 2009, Down was announced in the lineup for the 2009 Roskilde Festival in Denmark. Following these live dates, the band toured the United States and Canada during August and September 2009. On March 30, 2009, Down posted a statement on their message board indicating that they will be back in the studio from October through November writing and recording what will eventually become Down IV. In the summer of 2009, Down began a US tour without Rex on bass, who had developed acute pancreatitis.

On January 27, 2010, it was announced that Brown had nearly fully recuperated from his fight with pancreatitis. Down had discussed reconvening in New Orleans sometime after the 2010 Super Bowl to begin work on a new album. With a release date yet to be announced, the new album will be the band's fourth studio offering. After legal issues with Warner Brothers Records regarding the rights to the music, Down released the live album Diary of a Mad Band: Europe in the Year of VI on October 5, 2010, via Roadrunner Records. The title is a reference to Diary of a Madman, an Ozzy Osbourne album.

Brown's and Windstein's departures and EPs (2011–2014)

In 2011, Phil Anselmo commented on the future of Down, stating: "Man, there will be a time for Down. Matter of fact we had a meeting this past week, and I know Jimmy's gotta go do an Eyehategod tour in February. But after that, I think we're looking to do some shows starting in March. Maybe local around here, maybe even some Mardi Gras gigs. But yeah, last week we sat around and they played me some new stuff they're working on, and it sounds good. Sounds like it's got a lot of promise, and really they just need me in the fuckin' practice room. So all this is going to happen this year. It has to happen. I know there's a responsibility here. Down has a fanbase and they are very very very loyal. So I don't want to let those people down. They deserve some new music, we have it. We've demoed other songs, there's songs that haven't even been released that people have never heard, so there's always Down there. For all you people out there, don't you stress. We got the Down coming."

On May 11, 2011, Down announced on their Facebook page that they "demoed a brand new tune." Down played at Download Festival on Saturday June 11, 2011. They played alongside System of a Down, Avenged Sevenfold and Alice Cooper. Rex did not tour with Down during their spring 2011 shows. Crowbar bassist Pat Bruders filled in for Rex during those shows. "Rex is not gonna be with us," said Keenan. "He's got things he needs to deal with, and we gave him an ultimatum and he's trying to work things out. We've got Pat (Bruders) from Crowbar playing bass, and he's ass-kickin' in the same way. He plays with his fingers—which is really cool; he's got the whole Geezer Butler thing going on." When asked whether or not Brown was still considered a part of the band, Keenan was hopeful but hesitant: "I don't know what to really say on that; he's not out of the band, but he's not playing with us live." On June 22, 2011, Jimmy Bower announced that Rex Brown would not be returning to Down, and that Pat Bruders is his replacement.

The band spoke on their Facebook page and said they started recording new material on October 20. On January 16, 2012, they revealed track names for the new EP on Facebook. Initially, rumors spread about the possibility of Down releasing four EPs, instead of an album. However, when asked about it in an interview with Scuzz TV, Anselmo said that "It would be too pretentious, we try not to think as far ahead as that, and just go with what we feel at the time." In the summer of 2013, Kirk Windstein quit the band and was replaced by Bobby Landgraf. Down IV – Part II was released on May 13, 2014.

Following Anselmo's white power and Nazi salute controversy during the Dimebash event in the United States, the organizers of FortaRock Festival decided to cancel the appearance of the band for the 2016 event.

Next album (2018–present)
When speaking to Max Morin of Bucketlist Music Reviews in January 2018, Anselmo said about the follow-up album to 2007's Over the Under: 

In November 2019, Down announced they would be reuniting for a series of shows in 2020, including Graspop Metal Meeting, set to take place June 18–21, 2020 in Dessel, Belgium. In anticipation of the 25th anniversary of Down's first album NOLA, founding member Kirk Windstein confirmed he was returning to the band. During a December 2019 interview with BraveWorlds, Windstein said "anything Down does from here forward, whether it’s a full tour or one show, I'm 99.9% sure that I'm a part of it."

Band members

Current members
 Phil Anselmo – lead vocals (1991–present)
 Pepper Keenan – guitars, backing vocals (1991–present)
 Jimmy Bower – drums (1991–present)
 Kirk Windstein – guitars, backing vocals (1991–2013, 2019–present)
 Pat Bruders – bass (2011–present)

Former members
 Todd Strange – bass (1991–1999)
 Rex Brown – bass (1999–2011)
 Bobby Landgraf – guitars, backing vocals (2013–2019)

Live members
 Danny Theriot – bass (2009)

Timeline

Gallery

Discography

Studio albums

Extended plays

Live albums

Singles

References

External links

 Official website
 Official Facebook page
 

 
Heavy metal musical groups from Louisiana
Musical groups from New Orleans
Heavy metal supergroups
Musical groups established in 1991
Musical quintets
Groove metal musical groups
American sludge metal musical groups
1991 establishments in Louisiana